Pancrase: King of Pancrase Tournament Opening Round was a mixed martial arts event held by Pancrase Hybrid Wrestling. It took place at Sumo Hall in Tokyo, Japan on December 16, 1994. The event began the 2 day, 16 man tournament to crown the first ever champion of Pancrase and featured the Opening Round and Quarterfinals of the tournament.

The tournament was one of the biggest events in mixed martial arts history to that date and featured some of the best fighters in the world at the time, including future Ultimate Fighting Championship (UFC) champions Bas Rutten, Ken Shamrock, Frank Shamrock, and Maurice Smith, and top Japanese fighters Masakatsu Funaki, Minoru Suzuki and Manabu Yamada.

Background
The King of Pancrase tournament was a two-day tournament spanning from December 16, 1994 to December 17, 1994. The Opening Round and Quarterfinals took place on Day 1 and the Semifinals and Finals took place on Day 2 at the King of Pancrase Tournament Second Round. The winner of the tournament would become the first ever champion of Pancrase.

Results 
The tournament was seeded based on skill, matching #1 seeds with #4 seeds and #2 seeds with #3 seeds in the opening round. The tournament #1 seeds were Minoru Suzuki, Bas Rutten, Ken Shamrock and Masakatsu Funaki. The opening round saw a large upset as Frank Shamrock, who was making his MMA debut, knocked off #1 seed Bas Rutten via Majority Decision.

Main card

King of Pancrase Tournament bracket

See also 
 Pancrase
 List of Pancrase champions
 List of Pancrase events
 1994 in Pancrase

References

External links
 Official Pancrase Website
 Sherdog.com event results

1994 in mixed martial arts
Mixed martial arts in Japan
Sports competitions in Tokyo
1994 in Japanese sport
Pancrase events